Manor School Sports College is an academy school in Raunds, Northamptonshire, England, which serves the town of Raunds and many surrounding villages. The current Principal is Mr Lee Towers. The school is part of the Nene Education Trust. There were 771 pupils on roll in the 2014-15 college year. There are 66 teachers (full-time equivalent) and 13 classroom support staff.  The school became an Academy on 1 November 2011 and is a specialist sports college.

Achievement
In the college's latest Ofsted report in May 2016, the college was deemed to be at least "good" in all areas. In 2015 the college achieved results of 51% of pupils gaining at least 5 GCSEs at C grade or above including English and mathematics.

Percentage of pupils achieving 5+ GCSEs including maths and English 
2011: 57%
2012: 51%
2013: 50%
2014: 50%
2015: 51%
2017: 52%

Clubs and societies
The college runs a number of school clubs and is also home to a number of external clubs that use the facilities outside of school hours.

References

External links
School website
Archers of Raunds website

Academies in North Northamptonshire
Secondary schools in North Northamptonshire
Sport schools in the United Kingdom
Raunds
Specialist sports colleges in England